The Hindu Temple of The Woodlands is a Hindu temple in The Woodlands, Texas, in Greater Houston.

History
In 2005 the Hindu Temple organization was created, buying land later that year. In 2008 the construction on the initial two buildings, the sanctuary and welcome center, began.

This temple, originally the sole Hindu temple serving the northern part of Greater Houston, was scheduled to open in 2011. The temple, built for $3 million, is located in a  stone exterior building on an  plot of land along the Woodlands Parkway. It serves Hindus living in The Woodlands, Conroe, Spring, Tomball, and northern Harris County. The planning, fundraising, and construction took six years. Before the temple was built, residents of the service area of the temple had to travel about one and half hours per direction to temples in Pearland and Sugar Land.

In 2018 each prayer or meditation meeting has 100-200 adherents. That year temple was adding more 100 parking spaces and had plans to build another building.

Activities
The temple holds public holi celebrations and offers free yoga classes. It also has heritage classes for five languages of India.

See also
 Religion in Houston

References

External links
Hindu Temple of The Woodlands
http://hmsamerica.org/

Indian-American culture in Texas
Hindu temples in Texas
The Woodlands, Texas
Buildings and structures in Montgomery County, Texas
Religious buildings and structures completed in 2011
2011 establishments in Texas
Asian-American culture in Texas
21st-century Hindu temples